Bogota, also known as Bogota Farm, is a historic home and farm and national historic district located near Port Republic, Rockingham County, Virginia. The main house was built between 1845 and 1847, and is a two-story, five bay, brick Greek Revival style dwelling.  It features a brick cornice, stepped-parapet gable end walls, and a low-pitched gable roof.  The front facade has a two-story pedimented portico sheltering the center bay.  Also on the property are the contributing smokehouse, two slave dwellings, a garden area, bank barn, log house, and two archaeological sites including a possible slave cemetery.  On June 9, 1862, Bogota was the scene of action during the Battle of Port Republic.

It was listed on the National Register of Historic Places in 2009.

References

Houses on the National Register of Historic Places in Virginia
Farms on the National Register of Historic Places in Virginia
Archaeological sites on the National Register of Historic Places in Virginia
Historic districts on the National Register of Historic Places in Virginia
Greek Revival houses in Virginia
Houses completed in 1847
Houses in Rockingham County, Virginia
National Register of Historic Places in Rockingham County, Virginia
1847 establishments in Virginia